The Swatch FIVB World Tour 2007 was an international beach volleyball competition.

The tour consists of 12 tournaments with both genders and 10 separate gender tournaments.

One of the tournaments, was the 2007 Beach Volleyball World Championships in Gstaad, Switzerland.

The top eight finishes that a team has from January 1, 2007 to July 20, 2008, on the Swatch FIVB World Tour (2007 and 2008), SWATCH FIVB World Championships (2007) and on FIVB recognised Continental Championship Finals, counts towards Olympic qualification for the Beijing 2008 Olympic Games. The top 24 teams of each gender will compete in the Beijing Games. There can be a maximum of two teams per country.

Grand Slam
There were four Grand Slam tournaments. These events give a higher number of points and more money than the rest of the tournaments.

Paris, FranceHenkel Grand Slam, June 19 - 24, 2007
Stavanger, NorwayConocoPhillips Grand Slam, June 26 - July 1, 2007
Berlin, GermanySmart Grand Slam, July 11 - 15, 2007
Klagenfurt, AustriaA1 Grand Slam presented by Nokia, August 1 - 5, 2007

Tournament results

Women

Men

Medal table by country

Award winners

Men's Points Champions

Women’s Points Champions

Men's Award Winners

Women's Award Winners

SWATCH Most Outstanding Player
For each tournament, there is selected one MOP (Most Outstanding Player)

Men
 
 Montreal Open 
 A1 Grand Slam presented by NOKIA
 Otera Open
 Mazuri Open presented by Hotel Anders
 
 Italian Open presented by Abruzzo
 Espinho Open
 Brazil Open
 
 Henkel Grand Slam 
 World Series 13
 - VIP Open
 - Smart Grand Slam
 - St. Petersburg Open
 - ConocoPhilips Grand Slam
 - Bahrain Open
 - SWATCH FIVB World Championship powered by 1 to 1 Energy
 - PAF Open
 - China Shanghai Jinshan Open

References

Americans & Brazilians Headline 2007 SWATCH-FIVB World Tour Women’s Award Recipients, FIVB, November 8, 2007

External links
2007 Swatch FIVB World Tour - tour calendar at FIVB.org

 

2007 in beach volleyball
2007